RASNZ is a five-letter abbreviation with multiple meanings, as described below:
 Royal Astronomical Society of New Zealand, the New Zealand national astronomical society
 Refugees As Survivors New Zealand, the humanitarian NGO for refugees in New Zealand